Chak De! India is a 2007 Indian Hindi-language sports drama film directed by Shimit Amin and produced by Aditya Chopra under the banner of Yash Raj Films, with a script written by Jaideep Sahni. The film stars Shah Rukh Khan as Kabir Khan, former captain of the India men's national field hockey team. After a disastrous loss to Pakistan, Khan is ostracized from the sport owing to religious prejudice. 7 years later in an attempt to redeem himself, he becomes the coach for the Indian national women's hockey team, with the goal of turning its 16 contentious players into an award-winning team. The film is based on the life of Mir Ranjan Negi.

Sahni, a screenwriter, was inspired by the India women's national field hockey team's win at the 2002 Commonwealth Games to develop Chak De! Indias script after reading about it in a newspaper. The screenplay was fictional and the characters, while inspired by the real team and coaches, were invented by Sahni. Kabir Khan's struggles bore resemblance to those faced by real-life hockey player Mir Ranjan Negi, although Sahni was unaware of Negi's tribulations while writing the script. On the suggestion of Maharaj Krishan Kaushik, then coach of the women's hockey team, Sahni invited Negi to join the film's production team. A combination of professional players and actors were cast as the sixteen team members; workshops were conducted for training the actors in hockey and the players in acting. Kaushik and Negi would train Sahni, Khan and the other cast members over a period of six months. The sports scenes were choreographed by Rob Miller, and the soundtrack was composed by Salim–Sulaiman, with lyrics written by Sahni.

Chak De! India released in India on 10 August 2007, coinciding with the country's 60th Independence Day, and grossed  on a  budget, thus becoming the third-highest grossing Hindi film of 2007. It received widespread critical acclaim upon release, with praise for its direction, story, screenplay, dialogues, feminist themes, and performances of the cast, with high praise directed towards Khan's performance. A recipient of numerous accolades, Chak De! India won the National Film Award for Best Popular Film Providing Wholesome Entertainment at the 55th National Film Awards. It received a leading 10 nominations at the 53rd Filmfare Awards, including Best Film, Best Director (Amin) and Best Supporting Actress (Shukla), and won a leading 5 awards, including Best Film (Critics) and Best Actor (Khan). The title song remains highly popular and prominent in Indian popular culture and is played at sporting events regularly. Considered one of Khan's career-best performances, Chak De! India also proved to be socially impactful in India; its success brought about the re-organisation of the Indian Hockey Federation in April 2008, and former player Aslam Sher Khan pointed to the film as a model for the Indian team to work towards.

Plot
Chak De! India opens in Delhi during the final minutes of a Hockey World Cup match between Pakistan and India, with Pakistan leading 1–0. When Indian team captain Kabir Khan is fouled, he takes a penalty stroke. His shot just misses, causing India to lose the match. Soon afterwards, media outlets circulate a photograph of Khan shaking hands with the Pakistani captain. The sporting gesture is misunderstood, and Khan is suspected of throwing the game out of sympathy towards Pakistan. Religious prejudice forces him and his mother to leave town.

Seven years later Mr. Tripathi, the head of India's hockey association, meets with field hockey advocate Uttam Singh to discuss the Indian women's hockey team. According to Tripathi, the team has no future since the only long-term role for women is to "cook and clean". Uttam, however, tells him that Kabir Khan wants to coach the team. Initially sceptical, Tripathi agrees to the arrangement.

Khan finds himself in charge of a group of 16 young women divided by their competitive natures and regional prejudices. Komal Chautala, a village girl from Haryana, clashes with Preeti Sabarwal from Chandigarh; short-tempered Balbir Kaur from Punjab bullies Rani Dispotta and Soimoi Kerketa, who are from remote villages in Jharkhand. Mary Ralte from Mizoram and Molly Zimik, from Manipur in Northeast India, face widespread racial discrimination, and sexual comments from some strangers. Team Captain Vidya Sharma must choose between hockey and the wishes of her husband Rakesh's family, and Preeti's fiancé—Abhimanyu Singh, Vice-Captain of the India national cricket team—feels threatened by her involvement with the team.

Khan realises that he can make the girls winners only if he can help them overcome their differences. During his first few days as coach, he benches several players who refuse to follow his rules—including Bindiya Naik, the most experienced player. In response, Bindiya repeatedly encourages the other players to defy Khan. When she finally succeeds, Khan angrily resigns; however, he invites the staff and team to a farewell lunch at McDonald's. During the lunch, local boys eve tease Mary; Balbir attacks them, triggering a brawl between the boys and the team. Khan, recognising that they are finally acting as one for the first time, prevents the staff from intervening; he only stops a man from hitting one of the women from behind with a cricket bat. After the fight, the women ask Khan to remain their coach.

The team faces new challenges. When Tripathi refuses to send the women's team to Australia for the World Cup, Khan proposes a match against the men's team. Although his team loses, their performance inspires Tripathi to send them to Australia after all. Bindiya is upset with Khan for choosing Vidya over her as the captain of the team. Her consequent behaviour results in a 7–0 loss to Australia. When Khan confronts Bindiya about her actions on the field, Bindiya responds by attempting to have sex with Khan, to which he rejects & asks her to stay away from the game. Khan goes on to train the girls again, which is followed by victories over England, Spain, South Africa, New Zealand, and Argentina. Just before their game with South Korea, Khan approaches Bindiya, asking her to begin playing once more and break the strategy of 'Man to Man' marking used by the Korean team so they can win the match. Bindiya goes onto the field and with the help of Gunjan Lakhani manages to beat South Korea. They are again matched with Australia for the final; this time, they successfully defeat them to win the World Cup. When the team returns home, their families treat them with greater respect and Khan, his good name restored, returns with his mother to their ancestral home.

Cast
Shortly after the film's release, the media began referring to the 16 actresses who portrayed the players as the "Chak De! Girls". The panel of judges at the Screen Awards also used the term, awarding the Best Supporting Actress award to the "Chak De Girls" at the 14th Screen Awards in 2008.

Team

Additional cast
 Anjan Srivastav as Mr. Vishal Tripathi, the head Indian hockey official
 Vibha Chibber as Krishnaji, assistant coach for the Indian women's field hockey team
 Javed Khan as Sukhlal
 Mohit Chauhan as Uttam Singh, Kabir's former hockey teammate and friend
 Vivan Bhatena as Abimanyu Singh, Vice captain of the Indian national cricket team and Preeti's fiancé 
Nakul Vaid as Rakesh Sharma, Vidya's husband
 Joyshree Arora as Kabir's mother
Emily White as the Australian Field Hockey Goalie
Jimmy Lekkas as Argentinian coach.

Production

Development
A brief article about the victorious women's team at the 2002 Commonwealth Games inspired screenwriter Jaideep Sahni to create a film about the Indian women's hockey team, and he modelled Kabir Khan on hockey coach Maharaj Krishan Kaushik. After listening to the storyline Kaushik suggested that Sahani meet hockey player Mir Ranjan Negi, who faced accusations of throwing the match against Pakistan in the 1982 Asian Games. Shah Rukh Khan stated in a speech delivered at the University of Edinburgh that the phrase Chak De! was originally "an inspirational martial cry that Sikh soldiers used while lifting logs in order to make bridges across rivers on their campaigns against their enemies. It implies the will to get up and get on with it."

According to Sahani, he was unaware of Negi's plight while he wrote the script and any resemblance to Negi's life was coincidental. Negi agreed, saying that he did not "want to hog the limelight. This movie is not a documentary of Mir Ranjan Negi's life. It is in fact the story of a team that becomes a winning lot from a bunch of hopeless girls". Responding to media reports equating Kabir Khan with Negi, Sahani said: "Our script was written a year and a half back. It is very unfortunate that something, which is about women athletes, has just started becoming about Negi."

Casting

Although Salman Khan was initially signed for the lead role, he later withdrew due to creative differences with director Shimit Amin. Shah Rukh Khan (who had originally declined due to a scheduling conflict with Farhan Akhtar's Don (2006)) was later confirmed as Kabir Khan. Khan accepted the role partly because he used to play hockey in college: "I feel hockey as a sport has been monstrously neglected in our country. I used to play the game during college. In fact, I was quite a good hockey player. So the role was a lot like going back to my past." Some media sources called the actor's role offbeat, since it departed from his usual romantic image and included neither lip synched songs nor a single female lead.

Casting of the 16 actresses as the hockey players took over six months. Amin described the process as "very, very difficult" and "very strenuous because the requirement was they had to play – and act". A four-month training camp was held where the girls learned the rules of the game, took acting lessons and followed a strict diet; safety precautions were also taken. According to Amin, "Learning hockey is very tricky unlike, say, football. You have to know how to hold the stick, how to maneuver it, so it doesn't look fake on screen ... For those who were originally players, we had to make sure they were able to act as well. The dialogue was weighty; it isn't frivolous. It has to be delivered with a certain tone, in a certain manner". The actors, including Khan and the rest of the supporting cast, participated in a number of rehearsals and script readings before principal photography began.

Kaushik and his team taught the crew "all [they] knew about hockey". In an interview, he later said that he "taught him (Sahni) everything about the game, starting from how the camp is conducted, how the girls come from different backgrounds and cultures, the psychological factors involved. Also how the coach faces pressure to select girls from different states and teams". After Negi was suggested, the latter assembled a team of hockey players to train the actors. He later said that he "trained the girls for six months. Waking up at 4, traveling from Kandivali to Churchgate. We would retire around 11 in the night. It was tiring. But we were on a mission ... They couldn't run; couldn't hold the hockey sticks. I ensured none of them [would have to] cut their nails or eyebrows (as the players do). The girls have worked very hard. I salute them". Some of the actors, such as Chitrashi, Sandia, and Raynia, were cast because they were hockey players.

Rob Miller was the sport action director, choreographing the sports scenes, and worked with Negi to train the actors. About working with Khan, Negi recalled that everything was planned "including the penalty stroke that SRK missed. That shot alone took us nearly 20 hours as I was keen that it should be very realistic. I took the help of a lot of my former teammates. But more importantly, it was so easy working with SRK. He is unbelievably modest and was willing to do as many re-takes as we wanted".

Soundtrack

The soundtrack album of Chak De! India and the film's background music is composed by Salim–Sulaiman. This film marks the duo's first collaboration with actor Shah Rukh Khan. The lyrics for all the songs were written by Jaideep Sahni. The album features seven tracks with a remix song and a dialogue by Shah Rukh Khan from this film. The album was released on 11 July 2007, and upon its release 11,00,000 units of the album were sold, making it the eleventh highest selling soundtrack album of the year, according to the Indian trade website Box Office India.

The album received positive reviews from critics. Planet Bollywood rated the album 8/10 stars, with "Chak De! India", "Badal Pe Paaon Hai", "Ek Hockey Doongi Rakh Ke" and "Maula Maula Le Le Meri Jaan" as their top picks. Then stated "Salim-Sulaiman have shown that just like the girls' hockey team, every underdog has his/her day. The album is a relief from the usual Himeshsonic-Pritammatic soundtracks that are flooding the Bollywood music scene today. Here's hoping that the duo get more contracts and bring us some more fresh tracks."

Release
Chak De! India premiered on 13 August 2007 at Somerset House in London to an audience of over 2,000 during the Film4 Summer Screen and India Now festivals. It was released globally in theaters on 10 August 2007, playing on only 400 screens in India because of the middling response of Yash Raj Films's two previous films, Ta Ra Rum Pum and Jhoom Barabar Jhoom.

The film was screened in New Delhi on 17 August 2016, as part of the week-long Independence Day Film Festival. The festival was jointly presented by the Indian Directorate of Film Festivals and Ministry of Defense, commemorating India's 70th Independence Day.

Critical response
 

In an NPR interview via affiliate WBUR-FM, Mumbai Mirror columnist Aseem Chhabra called Chak De! India "an example of a film that's been made within the framework of Bollywood and yet it is a very different film. It does take up some realistic issues, and what I really liked about the film was that the women who acted, you know, who are part of the team, each one of them got a chance. Their personality, their characters, were very well-written, and so, the superstar in the film was Shahrukh Khan, who was the coach of the team; he doesn't sort of take over the whole film. Every supporting character gets a role, and it's a very inspiring movie that really changed the mood in India. People loved it". Nikhat Kazmi of The Times of India gave the film four out of five stars stating that it was a film of "great performances by a bunch of unknowns." India Today called Chak De! India "the most feisty girl power movie to have come out of Bollywood ever." Sudhish Kamath of The Hindu wrote, "At another level, Chak De is about women's liberation. It is one of the best feminist films of our times." Rajeev Masand of CNN-IBN gave the film four out of five stars, saying "Chak De's ... a winner all the way." Shubhra Gupta of The Indian Express called the film "the most authentic, meticulously researched sports movie India has made".  In Kolkata's Telegraph, Bharathi S. Pradhan wrote that the film combines "an extremely well-knit screenplay with unrelentingly deft direction, 16 unknown, and not even glamorous, girls simply carried you with them, with one single known actor compelling you to watch Chak De India without blinking". Jaspreet Pandohar of the BBC gave Chak De! India four out of five stars stating that "while the tale of the sporting underdog is hardly new, Jaideep Sahni's screenplay offers a rare look at a popular Indian sport often overshadowed by cricket." Andy Webster of The New York Times wrote that the film gave a fresh look to the conventional underdog sports film, comparing its premise to the U.S. victory in the 1991 FIFA Women's World Cup. Derek Elley of Variety called Chak De! India "a patriotic heartwarmer that scores some old-fashioned entertainment goals." In The Hollywood Reporter, Kirk Honeycutt wrote that the "technical credits are first rate with excellent cinematography, quicksilver editing, musical montages of practice and a fine use of locations."

Michael Dequina of themoviereport.com was more critical of the film, giving it 2.5 out of four stars and calling it "a very familiar, very formula underdog sports movie with nothing to distinguish it from similar, equally slick Hollywood product." Maitland McDonagh of TV Guide gave Chak De! India two stars out of four, writing that the film uses "sports-movie conventions to address larger cultural and political issues, and while it doesn't miss a cliche, it also invests every one with vigorous conviction." Although Subhash K. Jha gave the film 3.5 stars, calling it "a fairly predictable story" with dialogue "quite often the stuff bumper stickers are made of", he wrote that "Chak De! India is an outright winner" and "one of the finest sports-based dramas in living memory." Khalid Mohamed gave the film 3.5 stars in the Hindustan Times stating that the film "may be predictable but compels you to root for a team of losers whom only an earth-angel can save from disastrous defeat".

Apart from critics, Chak De! India tied with Taare Zameen Par for the Best Film of 2007 according to various Bollywood movie directors such as Madhur Bhandarkar, David Dhawan, Rakeysh Omprakash Mehra, Anurag Basu, and Sriram Raghavan.

The film was mentioned in critic and author Shubhra Gupta's book, 50 Films That Changed Bollywood, 1995–2015.

Box office 
Due to the film's strong critical response, cinema halls reported 80% occupancy for its opening weekend. Chak De! India topped the Indian box office during its first two weeks, and played to full houses during its first two months. The film was particularly successful in large cities. Chak De! India was the third-highest-grossing film of 2007 in India, with domestic net earnings of ₹66,54,00,000 that year it was declared a box office 'Blockbuster'. By the end of its theatrical run, the film grossed  worldwide, including  gross ( net) in India and  overseas.

Accolades

Social impact
Chak De! India has become an influential film. The title track song "Chak De! India," now doubles as a sports anthem in India and is played at numerous sports events. According to Salim Merchant, the song "almost became the sports anthem of the country, especially after India won the Cricket World Cup 2011. It was no longer our song but the country's song". After India's World Cup victory, Indian team player Virat Kohli "sang 'Chak de India' to the crowd". When India defeated South Africa at the 2015 Cricket World Cup, Nitin Srivastava of the BBC noted: "MCG has erupted with "Vande Mataram" (the national song of India) and "Chak De India" (Go India!) slogans in the air! And there's no age barrier for cricket fans who came and enjoyed the match".

In addition, the suspension of the Indian Hockey Federation in April 2008 also indicated the film's influence. India Today used the title to label the event in two articles, titled "Operation Chak De! impact: Jothikumaran resigns" and "Operation Chak De! impact: Furore in Lok Sabha". The Indiatimes, in an article titled, "Five wise men set for a Chak De! act" also argued, "It looks like Indian hockey has done a real Chak de this time around". In addition, former hockey player Aslam Sher Khan, who was appointed by the Indian Olympic Association to head a committee which will replace the IHF, pointed to the film as a model to work towards. He stated in an interview, "We have to make a Team India as you have seen in Bollywood blockbuster Chak De! India. There are players from several parts of the country. We have to unite them to make a powerful force." In another interview, he emphasised that he wants "to create a Chak De effect" on hockey in India.

References

Further reading 

 Chakraborty, M.N. "Nationalist transactions: Chak De! India and the down-and-out sports coach." In Continuum: Journal of Media & Cultural Studies, Volume 26, Issue 6, 2012. Special Issue:   India/Cinema: An Archive of Politics and Pleasures.
 De, Aparajita. "Sporting with gender: Examining sport and belonging at home and in the diaspora through Patiala House & Chak De! India." South Asian Popular Culture, Volume 11, Issue 3, 2013:287-300. (Special Issue:   Sport and South Asian Diasporas).
 Gaikwad, Vandana, and Dr. Prasanna Joeg. "Chak De India Movie demonstrates the values of Scrum Team & Scrum Master – A Case Study." International Journal of Advanced Research,  Volume 3, Issue 6, June 2015: 613–618.
 Kaushik, Nancy. "Exclusion in Cinematic Space: A Case Study of Chak De India." Innovation: International Journal of Applied Research.  (Volume-1, Issue-1). December 2013.
 Madhav, Tushar, Koshy, Vasundhara Anna, Usmani, Aaquib Shehbaaz, Rajani, Mohita, Ahmed, Mudasser and Samra, Kanika."Terrorists and Patriots: Construction in Popular Hindi Cinema." Social Science Research Network, 2 May 2008.
 Ransom, Amy J. "Bollywood Goes to the Stadium:Gender, National Identity, and Sport Film in Hindi." Journal of Film and Video, Volume 66, Number 4, Winter 2014, pp. 34–49.

External links 
 
 
 

2007 films
Films set in Delhi
Indian feminist films
Films about women in India
Films about women's sports
Films shot in Australia
Films set in Australia
 Films shot in Delhi
2000s Hindi-language films
Indian-Australian films
Indian sports films
Films about social issues in India
Women's field hockey in India
Yash Raj Films films
Best Popular Film Providing Wholesome Entertainment National Film Award winners
Films directed by Shimit Amin
Men's Hockey World Cup
Women's Hockey World Cup
2000s sports films
Films about field hockey in India